Mamudu Adamu (born 22 September 1960) is a Nigerian judoka, He competed in the, 1988 Summer Olympics.

Judo

References

1960 births
Living people
Judoka at the 1988 Summer Olympics
Nigerian male judoka
Olympic judoka of Nigeria
African Games medalists in judo
Competitors at the 1987 All-Africa Games
African Games bronze medalists for Nigeria